The team eventing in equestrian at the 2016 Summer Olympics in Rio de Janeiro was held at National Equestrian Center from 6 to 9 August.

The French team of Karim Laghouag, Thibaut Vallette, Mathieu Lemoine and Astier Nicolas won the gold medal. Germany won the silver medal and Australia took bronze.

Competition format

The team and individual eventing competitions used the same scores.  Eventing consisted of a dressage test, a cross-country test, and a jumping test. The jumping test had two rounds, with only the first used for the team competition. Team eventing final scores were the sum of the three best overall individual scores (adding the three components) from the four-pair teams.

Schedule

Times are Brasília time, BRT (UTC−03:00)

Results

Standings after dressage 

Note: The team penalties given above are for the top three in each team at this stage and may not tally with the final total scores. The final results are determined by adding the total scores of the top three team members at the end of the competition.

Standings after cross-country 

Note: The team penalties given above are for the top three in each team at this stage and may not tally with the final total scores. The final results are determined by adding the total scores of the top three team members at the end of the competition.

Standings after jumping (Final Standings) 

Final results below, determined by combining the three best overall scores for each team.

References

Team eventing